Blessings Golf Club is a private, 18-hole golf course located along Clear Creek in Johnson, Arkansas, near Fayetteville. Its creation was funded by Tyson Foods Chairman John H. Tyson. Blessings was designed by Robert Trent Jones, Jr. and opened in June 2004. From the back tees, its rating is 79.1 and its slope is 153, making it one of the toughest golf courses in the U.S. Its routing is a true "out-in" design, in that the 9th hole does not end at the clubhouse. Blessings features three  par-5 holes on the "out" nine and three par-3 holes on the "in" nine, for a par of 37-35=72. Its topography is characterized by hilly terrain creating numerous sidehill lies, dramatic elevation changes, forced carries over ravines and valleys, and large, undulating greens, with Clear Creek in play on several holes.

Blessings' clubhouse was designed in a modern style by architect Marlon Blackwell.  The clubhouse is outfitted with natural, organic design features including local stone and imported, exotic woods used throughout the interior. It features a pro shop, restaurant, lounge, men's and women's locker rooms, a large indoor practice facility, and a swimming pool.

Blessings is also home to the University of Arkansas golf teams.  The membership and the Razorbacks enjoy the Fred and Mary Smith practice facility, located on the grounds.  It features six indoor/outdoor practice bays, an indoor video swing analysis station, office space and fully furnished men and women’s locker room facilities for the Razorbacks. As well as a 40 yard indoor chipping/pitching area.

The 2019 NCAA Division I Women's and Men's Golf Championship was held at Blessings, with the Duke women and Stanford men winning the team titles. Maria Fassi of Arkansas was the women's individual champion and Matthew Wolff of Oklahoma State won the men's individual title.

References

Golf clubs and courses in Arkansas
College golf clubs and courses in the United States
Buildings and structures in Fayetteville, Arkansas
2004 establishments in Arkansas
Sports in Fayetteville, Arkansas